The 2012 West Virginia Mountaineers football team represented West Virginia University in the 2012 NCAA Division I FBS football season. The season marked the Mountaineers' first season as members of the Big 12 Conference. In addition, the 2012 season was the first for the team since 1942 without a Backyard Brawl matchup against their top rival Pittsburgh due to their exit from the Big East Conference after the 2011 season. The Mountaineers were led by Dana Holgorsen in his second season as head coach. Joe DeForest and Keith Patterson served as co-defensive coordinators in their first season at WVU, while Shannon Dawson was elevated to offensive coordinator after serving as the team's receivers coach in the 2011 season. West Virginia played its home games on Mountaineer Field at Milan Puskar Stadium in Morgantown, West Virginia.

West Virginia, entered the 2012 season ranked 11th in AP Poll and were projected to contend with Oklahoma for the Big 12 in their first season in the conference. The Mountaineers won their first five games of the season, which included a shootout win over #25 Baylor on homecoming, and a high-scoring affair with #11 Texas. The Mountaineers who had risen up to #5 in the AP Poll, went on the road to face the Texas Tech, a game which they fell behind 35–7, and would ultimately lose 49–14. The Texas Tech loss was the start of 5–game losing streak, which saw the Mountaineers fall completely out the AP Poll, and out of Big 12 title contention. The Mountaineers recovered and won their final two games, to finish out the regular season with an 7–5 record, 4–5 in Big 12 play to finish in a four-way tie for fourth place. They were invited to the Pinstripe Bowl where they were defeated by longtime rival Syracuse.

Preseason

2012 recruiting class

Big 12 media poll

Oklahoma (32), 396
West Virginia (7), 339
Texas 291
Oklahoma State, 267
 (1), 260
Kansas State (1), 257
Baylor, 162
Iowa State, 121
Texas Tech, 116
Kansas, 46

Awards candidates

Heisman Trophy
Tavon Austin
Geno Smith

Fred Biletnikoff Award
Tavon Austin
Stedman Bailey

Walter Camp Award
Tavon Austin
Geno Smith

Lou Groza Award
Tyler Bitancurt

Paul Hornung Award
Tavon Austin

Lombardi Award
Joe Madsen

Manning Award
Geno Smith

Maxwell Award
Geno Smith
Tavon Austin

Davey O'Brien Award
Geno Smith

Rimington Trophy
Joe Madsen

Johnny Unitas Award
Geno Smith

Coaching staff

Roster

Schedule

Game summaries

Marshall

James Madison

Maryland

#25 Baylor

#11 Texas

Texas Tech

#4 Kansas State

TCU

Oklahoma State

#13 Oklahoma

Iowa State

Kansas

Syracuse–Pinstripe Bowl

Rankings

References

West Virginia
West Virginia Mountaineers football seasons
West Virginia Mountaineers football